2022 Kabul school bombing may refer to:
 April 2022 Kabul school bombing
 September 2022 Kabul school bombing